Plocoscelus is a genus of flies in the family Micropezidae. Species are found in Central and South Americas.

References 

 Mortal mimicry in the fly, Plocoscelus sp.(Diptera, Micropezidae). WG Eberhard, Biotropica, 1999

External links 

 
 Plocoscelus at insectoid.info

Micropezidae
Nerioidea genera